Nelson Welch Cheney (June 27, 1875 – November 23, 1944) was an American politician from New York.

Life
He was born on June 27, 1875, in Buffalo, New York, the son of Edgar Orlando Cheney (1843–1904) and Philena C. (Welch) Cheney. There he attended the public schools, and Central High School. He graduated B.A. from Cornell University in 1899.

On June 4, 1904, he married Edith Ingram, and they had four children. They lived in Eden

Cheney was a member of the New York State Assembly in 1916, 1917 (both Erie Co., 9th D.), 1918, 1919, 1920, 1921, 1922, 1923, 1924, 1925, 1926, 1927, 1928 and 1929 (all twelve Erie Co., 8th D.). He was Chairman of the Committee on Claims in 1918, and later for many years Chairman of the Committee on Banks.

He was a member of the New York State Senate (50th D.) from 1930 to 1938, sitting in the 152nd, 153rd, 154th, 155th, 156th, 157th, 158th, 159th, 160th and 161st New York State Legislatures.

He died on November 23, 1944; and was buried at the Forest Lawn Cemetery in Buffalo.

Assemblyman Nelson Welch (1808–1900) was his grandfather.

Notes

External links

1875 births
1944 deaths
Republican Party New York (state) state senators
Politicians from Buffalo, New York
Republican Party members of the New York State Assembly
Cornell University alumni
Burials at Forest Lawn Cemetery (Buffalo)